A Second Look was a Canadian current affairs television program which aired on CBC Television in 1964.

Premise
This program, a successor to Let's Face It, reviewed up to three news stories per episode. It was hosted by Gary Lautens, a humour columnist of the Toronto Star.

Guests included British Labour Party parliamentarian Anthony Wedgewood-Benn and American political author Richard Rovere.

Scheduling
The half-hour program aired on alternate Sundays at 10:00 p.m. (Eastern) from 26 January to 9 August 1964, with Horizon broadcast on other weeks. This show was distinct from a 1969 CBC series of the same name.

Lautens, however, lacked television experience while having little say in the production. That, combined with a vague program concept made A Second Look unsuccessful.

References

External links
 

CBC Television original programming
1964 Canadian television series debuts
1964 Canadian television series endings
Black-and-white Canadian television shows
1960s Canadian television news shows